The 9×18mm Makarov (designated 9mm Makarov by the C.I.P. and often called 9×18mm PM) is a Soviet pistol and submachine gun cartridge. During the latter half of the 20th century it was a standard military pistol cartridge of the Soviet Union and the Eastern Bloc, analogous to the 9×19mm Parabellum in NATO and Western Bloc military use.

History
During the Second World War and the early Cold War, the 7.62×25mm Tokarev was the standard automatic pistol round for the Soviet Union and its satellites in Eastern Europe. This ammunition is still in use by many of these countries today. During the war, the Red Army had found a few shortcomings in its 7.62 mm TT-33 pistol, one of which was a tendency to inadvertently drop its magazine while in operation. The army wanted something that was lighter, with a heel release instead of a button and different ammunition. A direct blowback design was chosen for the pistol's operation, since it would be quick and cheap to manufacture, as well as accurate, due to the fixed-barrel design allowed by direct blowback operation.

The 9×18mm round was designed by Boris V. Semin in 1946, and was intended to be a relatively powerful round with modest bolt thrust that could function safely in a simple or direct blowback pistol. It was based on the 9×18mm Ultra cartridge which was developed in 1936 by Gustav Genschow & Co. for the German Luftwaffe, as a more powerful alternative to the 9×17mm used in the Walther PP, also a simple blowback design pistol. Nikolay Fyodorovich Makarov went on to design the Makarov PM pistol around the 9×18mm round in 1947. In 1951 both the Makarov pistol and the round were accepted by the Soviet Army, hence the round became commonly known thereafter as the Makarov as well (it is not its official designation).

Calibers in the USSR were measured between the lands in the rifling and not the grooves. As such, 9×18mm Makarov ammunition uses a larger diameter bullet than other common 9 mm rounds, measuring 9.27 mm (0.365 in), compared with 9.017 mm (0.355 in) for 9×19mm Parabellum. After its introduction in 1951, the 9×18mm Makarov round spread throughout the militaries of Eastern Bloc nations.

Cartridge dimensions
The 9×18mm Makarov has 0.83 ml (12.8 grains H2O) cartridge case capacity.

9×18mm Makarov maximum C.I.P. cartridge dimensions. All sizes in millimeters (mm).

The common rifling twist rate for this cartridge is 1 in 240 mm (9.45 in), 4 grooves, ø lands = 9.00 mm, ø grooves = 9.27 mm, land width = 4.50 mm and the primer type is small pistol.

According to the official C.I.P. rulings the 9×18mm Makarov case can handle up to  piezo pressure. In C.I.P. regulated countries every pistol cartridge combo must be proofed at 130% of this maximum C.I.P. pressure to certify for sale to consumers.

The 9×18mm Makarov is ballistically inferior to the 9×19mm Parabellum cartridge. While there are no official SAAMI pressure specifications for the 9×18mm Makarov cartridge, tests indicate that surplus ammunition develop pressures in the mid 20,000 psi, significantly less than the 35,000 psi or more generated by 9×19mm Parabellum (+P) loads. As such it is designed to be used in low-powered blowback semiautomatics, much like the .380 ACP cartridge, rather than locked-breech designs encountered, but not always required, for higher pressure cartridges like the 9×19mm Parabellum.

Basic specifications of 21st century Russian service loads
The 9×18mm Makarov rounds in use with the Armed Forces of the Russian Federation are designed for pistols and submachine guns. In 2003, there were several variants of 9×18mm Makarov produced for various purposes. All used clad metal as case material.

The bullet has a clad metal envelope totally covering the core. The bullet's nose is spherical with no distinguishing colour of the tip.

The RG028 cartridge is loaded with an enhanced penetration bullet and is designed to kill personnel wearing body armour. The bullet has a core of hardened steel.

The SP-7 cartridge is loaded with an enhanced stopping effect half plastic and half lead core jacketed hollow point bullet and is designed to defeat live targets. The bullet has a black tip.

The SP-8 cartridge is loaded with a lightweight half plastic and half lead core low-penetration jacketed hollow point bullet and is designed to engage personnel.

The 7N25 is a high-velocity cartridge loaded with a steel core bullet.

Firearms chambered for 9×18mm Makarov

Pistols
Makarov PM
Stechkin APS
MP-448 Skyph
ČZ vz. 82
FEG PA-63, SMC-918, R-61, RK-59
P-83 Wanad
P-64 pistol
 R-92
 OTs-01 Stechkin (RSA)
 OTs-27
OTs-33
Fort 12
Grand Power P9M
ZVI KEVIN M
SilencerCo Maxim 9

Submachine guns and machine pistols
Škorpion vz. 65 and vz. 82
PM-63 RAK
PM-84 Glauberyt
 PP-90 Penal
PP-91 KEDR
 PP-93
OTs-02 Kiparis
OTs-33 Pernach
PP-19 Bizon
Arsenal Shipka
Borz, used by Chechen Republic of Ichkeria during the First Chechen War

Gallery

Synonyms
9mm Makarov
9×18mm
9×18mm PM
9mm Mak
9×18mm Soviet

See also
9 mm caliber
9×39mm
Barnaul Ammunition
List of handgun cartridges
Red Army Standard Ammunition
Wolf Ammunition

References

External links

9x18 pistol cartridges
Ballistics By The Inch 9mm Makarov results
C.I.P. TDCC datasheet 9 mm Makarov
Gunboards Forums, 9x18 Ammunition Data

Pistol and rifle cartridges
Military cartridges

Weapons and ammunition introduced in 1951
Soviet inventions